Raymond Blair (born 12 November 1958) was a Scottish footballer who played for Dumbarton, St Johnstone, Motherwell and East Fife, before moving to Australia to play with West Adelaide in the National Soccer League.

External links
Raymond Blair at Aussie Footballers

References

1958 births
Scottish footballers
Dumbarton F.C. players
St Johnstone F.C. players
Motherwell F.C. players
East Fife F.C. players
Scottish Football League players
National Soccer League (Australia) players
West Adelaide SC players
Living people
Association football wingers